Heart of the Heartland is the first album in Peter Ostroushko's "heartland trilogy", released in 1995. Pilgrims on the Heart Road and Sacred Heart complete the trilogy.

Music from Heart of the Heartland was used by Ken Burns for the PBS documentary Lewis & Clark: The Journey of the Corps of Discovery and his arrangement of "Sweet Betsy from Pike" was used in Burns' Mark Twain. "Dakota Themes" are a series of pieces Peter originally wrote and recorded for the PBS documentary "The Dakota Conflict" (1993) directed by Kristian Berg. The melody for "Kaposia" (a Dakota village on the Mississippi River near present day St. Paul, Minnesota) is a variation on a Native American flute piece Peter learned from Dakota flute player Kevin Locke's rendition of "Zuni Sunrise". Music from the album was also later featured in the film Into The Wild (2007).

Track listing 
All songs by Peter Ostroushko unless otherwise noted.
"Seattle (The Fantasy Reel)" – 7:20
"Prairie Sunrise" – 3:26
"Puppy Belly Dance" – 5:07
"Montana" – 4:50
"Dakota Themes: Kasposia/Pioneer Waltz/Pigs Eye Reel" – 5:48
"Heart of the Heartland" – 3:26
"Nicaragua (Prelude and Dance)" – 8:30
"Sweet Betsy from Pike" (Traditional) – 5:03
"Virginia Reel from Hell Medley: Spotted Pony/Mississippi Reel/Wrystra" (Ostroushko, Traditional) – 5:00
"(Twilight on) The Sangre de Cristos" – 3:35

Personnel
Peter Ostroushko – mandolin, fiddle
Richard Dworsky – piano, Hammond organ
Dean Magraw – guitar
Gordon Johnson – bass
Bruce Kurnow – harmonica
Cecilia Rossiter - cello
Sarah Lewis – cello
Marc Anderson – percussion
David Bullock – violin

Production notes
Produced and mixed by Peter Ostroushko
Bob Feldman – executive producer
Engineered and mixed by Tom Mudge
Artwork and design by George Ostroushko
Photography by Dan Corrigan

References

1995 albums
Peter Ostroushko albums
Red House Records albums